Afrixalus wittei is a species of frog in the family Hyperoliidae. Its common name is De Witte's spiny reed frog. It is found in Angola, Democratic Republic of the Congo, Tanzania, and Zambia.

Its natural habitats are moist savanna, flooded grassland, marshes, and temporary pools.

References

wittei
Frogs of Africa
Taxonomy articles created by Polbot
Amphibians described in 1941